Tamzara is the second album by Armenian folk singers Inga and Anush.

Track listing

External links 
 
Listen to the album online

2006 albums